Thomas Toivonen is a Sweden-Finnish lead guitarist in the heavy metal band Primal Roots.

When he was eleven years old he started to teach himself how to play the guitar that he got as a Christmas gift from his father. The following years Thomas Toivonen played in numerous bands with varying styles like heavy metal, indie rock and reggae where he shifted between the guitar, bass, keyboard and drums, instruments that he was mainly self-taught on.

In 2006, during his Free Jazz period, Thomas Toivonen's music was played on the radio show Taran's Free Jazz Hour, in Angers, France and the radio show Now's the time with Kevin LeGendre (on the London based non-profit community radio station  Resonance FM)

In 2007 Thomas Toivonen appeared in the second edition of the Czech encyclopedia: Svět jiné hudby (The World of Another Music) by Zdeněk Slabý.

In the spring of 2008 Thomas Toivonen was photographed in Paris, France by the American art photographer Ralph Gibson for his exhibition and book: State of the Axe: Guitar Masters in Photographs and Words (2008)

In September, 2013, he released a documentary film named Truká - In the name of the Enchanteds  and it is about the Truká people, in the state of Pernambuco, Brazil, that live on islands on the São Francisco river and their struggle against a controversial water diversion project.

In 2020, the band Primal Roots, which Thomas is the lead guitarist of, released the single Black, which is their first official release.

References

External links 
 https://www.facebook.com/primalrootsbandgreece
 Taran's Free Jazz Hour

Finnish jazz musicians
Living people
Finnish multi-instrumentalists
Year of birth missing (living people)
Swedish people of Finnish descent